Jinggangshan University (JGSU) is in the Jinggangshan Mountains in Qingyuan District, Ji'an city of Jiangxi province in China. JGSU is jointly supported by the Ministry of Education of the People's Republic of China and the People's Government of Jiangxi Province, pair-assisted by Tongji University and authorized by Nanjing Military Region for cultivation of military talents and cadres.

JGSU comprises 21 schools offering 75 undergraduate majors with modern language laboratories and computer centers covering around 170 hectares. Out of nearly 1600 academic staff, 129 are professors and 409 associate professors, of which 154 possess a doctoral degree, and 611 a master's degree.

Jinggangshan University was ranked at 1038 according to the 2015 world university ranking.

The Journal of Jinggangshan University is a monthly periodical published by JGSU which covers the fields of philosophy and social sciences and nature sciences, each with their own editions.

History
Jinggangshan University was established in 1958 in Ji'an. Chinese Communist Party Chairman Mao Zedong and his colleagues established the first rural base of the revolution in the Jinggangshan Mountains in 1927. In 1963, JGSU was closed for five years due to poor economic conditions in China.

In 1978, to reinstate JGSU, the Branch of Jiangxi Normal University and the Jiangxi Medical University in Jinggangshan were joined together. In April 1982 and March 1993, they were renamed as 'Jinggangshan Teacher's College' and 'Jinggangshan Medical School", respectively. In March 2000, after approval by the Ministry of Education of the People's Republic of China (MOE), Jinggangshan Teacher's College was renamed to Jinggangshan University after merging with Ji'an Educational Institute. In July 2003, approved once again by the MOE, Jinggangshan Normal University was renamed to Jinggangshan University by joining Jinggangshan Medicine College and Jinggangshan Vocational Technical College.

Medical School

The Medical School of Jinggangshan University possesses a Level 3A graded affiliated hospital, the Jinggangshan University Affiliated Hospital, which consists of 35 medical departments and sections with a capacity of 522 sick beds.

The medical school is listed in WHO, FAIMER, the Geneva Foundation for Medical Education and Research (GFMER), for INDIA, as well as the AVICENNA Directory for medicine.

Schools

School of Political Science and Law
School of Marxism
School of Humanities
School of Foreign Languages
School of Business
School of Mathematical Sciences and Physics
School of Mechanical Engineering
School of Architecture
School of Chemistry and Chemical Engineering
School of Life Sciences
School of Electronic and Information Technology
School of Education
School of Medicine
School of Nursing
School of Arts
School of Physical Education
School of National Defense Students
School of Training

Affiliated institutions
 Jinggangshan University Affiliated High School

See also

Xinjiang Medical University
Nanchang University
Yichun University
Guilin University of Technology
Solano Community College
University of California, Davis

References

External links

Jinggangshan University
Jinggangshan University (Archive) - jgsu.edu.cn/english/
Jinggangshan University (Archive) - ice.jgsu.edu.cn/english/
 Jinggangshan University
 Affiliated Hospital of Jinggangshan University
"University re-established in cradle of Chinese revolution." (Archive) People's Daily. October 30, 2007.
JXCN
Foreign Students of JGSU (Archive)
井冈山大学腐败

Universities in China with English-medium medical schools
Universities and colleges in Jiangxi
Buildings and structures in Ji'an